Gidion Vermeulen is a South African international lawn bowler.

Bowls career
He won a gold medal in the Men's triples at the 2010 Commonwealth Games with Johann Pierre du Plessis and Wayne Perry.

He finished runner-up in the 2010 pairs at the National Championships bowling for the Westville Bowls Club. 

In 2011 he won the triples bronze medal at the Atlantic Bowls Championships. The following year he won a silver medal in the fours at the 2012 World Outdoor Bowls Championship.

References

Living people
Commonwealth Games gold medallists for South Africa
Commonwealth Games bronze medallists for South Africa
Bowls players at the 2006 Commonwealth Games
Bowls players at the 2010 Commonwealth Games
South African male bowls players
Commonwealth Games medallists in lawn bowls
1970 births
Medallists at the 2006 Commonwealth Games
Medallists at the 2010 Commonwealth Games